The Apse from La Seu d'Urgell is an apse exhibited at the National Art Museum of Catalonia in Barcelona.

Description
The decoration on this apse is a noteworthy sample from the MNAC's unique collection of Romanesque mural painting, most of which comes from the diocese of Urgell.

In the apse there was a large representation of the Theophany, or manifestation of the Lord, inspired in the Gospel and the Book of Revelation. Christ appeared in all his splendour, upright and imposing in the mandorla of his glory, with the Earth as his footstool, in keeping with the Biblical interpretation. He was surrounded by the Tetramorph, or symbols of the Evangelists, of which John's eagle and Luke's bull are preserved almost whole.

The vision evoked in this image is both the Ascent of Christ and his triumphant return at the end of time. An attractive Greek fret in the classical tradition separates this register from the one below, in which are the Virgin and the Apostles, centred in the figures of St Peter, with the keys, and Mary, with a crown in her hand, a curious iconographic detail referring to the Kingdom of Heaven.

Also portrayed are Andrew, with the cross, a beardless John the Evangelist and Paul, the Apostle of the Gentiles, who represent the Church militant attending the manifestation of God. Attractive floral borders decorated the windows. Stylistically, these paintings show a synthesis of different influences from Lombardy, Occitania and Peitieu.

See also
 Altar frontal from Tavèrnoles

Notes

References

External links
 The artwork at Museum's website

Paintings in the collection of the Museu Nacional d'Art de Catalunya
12th-century paintings
La Seu d'Urgell